Goniobranchus sinensis is a species of colourful sea slug, a dorid nudibranch, a marine gastropod mollusc in the family Chromodorididae.

Distribution
This marine species was described from Hong Kong. It also occurs in Japan and has been reported from Indonesia and Malaysia.

Description

Goniobranchus sinensis is a chromodorid nudibranch with a semi-translucent white mantle and coloured margin. In this species there is a yellow band, then a red marginal band with a narrow opaque white band at the very edge of the mantle. The rhinophores and gills are cherry red. The body reaches a length of 20 mm.

References

Chromodorididae
Gastropods described in 1985